Emirhan Yalçın (2003–2021) was stabbed by a Syrian group in the Altındağ district of Ankara on 10 August 2021 and died the next day due to the injuries he sustained in the attack. The attack took place after a fight between a group of Syrians and Yalçın and his friends in a park in the Battalgazi Neighborhood. Yalçın and Ali Yasin Güler, who were wounded in the fight, were taken to Dışkapı Yıldırım Beyazıt Training and Research Hospital. Yalçın, who was reportedly wounded near his heart, was pronounced dead on 11 August. After it was announced that the perpetrators were Syrian, attacks targeting Syrians took place in Altındağ in response to Yalçın's murder.

Overview 
Yalçın's injury occurred on 10 August 2021, as a result of a fight of unknown origin and a stabbing incident that followed. The fight took place between a group of Syrian nationals and Yalçın and others. 26-year-old Yahya Abdo and Muhammed Abdo were arrested after the incident for allegedly injuring Yalçın. In his statement, Abdo said, "I suddenly started arguing with Emirhan, whom I had not seen before, in the park. Then we had a fight and I hit Emirhan with the knife I found in the park. Then I panicked and ran away. I am very regretful for committing this crime."

Aftermath 

After the incident, it was announced that all shops in the neighborhood were closed as a precautionary measure. Nevşin Mengü reported that Syrians were evacuated from the neighborhood.

After it was announced that the perpetrators were Syrian nationals, attacks targeting Syrians took place in Altındağ in response to Yalçın's murder. These attacks included throwing stones at houses identified as belonging to Syrians, attacking their shops and overturning their cars. Other neighborhood residents reportedly tried to protect their shops with tarpaulins with the moon and star drawn on them and the words "T.C. Turkish Shop". A Syrian child was reportedly injured in the head as a result of the attacks. 76 people were detained as a result of the attacks  Evrensel and Birgün described these attacks as racist, while Yeşil Gazete described them as a pogrom

References 

2021 deaths
Deaths by person in Asia
Deaths by stabbing in Turkey